Gymnelia lucens is a moth of the subfamily Arctiinae. It was described by Paul Dognin in 1902. It is found in Colombia and Peru.

References

Gymnelia
Moths described in 1902